Javad Ghenaat (born 1966) is an Iranian conservative politician who currently serves as the governor of South Khorasan Province.

Early life and education
Ghenaat was born in Amol in the Mazandaran province in 1966. He holds bachelor's degree in Pure Chemistry and received a PhD in Organic Chemistry  from Mazandaran University.

References

1966 births
Living people
Governors of South Khorasan Province
Governors of Golestan Province
People from Amol